Pablo Martín Ruiz (born 17 July 1987) is an Argentine footballer who plays as a left winger for San Martín de San Juan.

Career

Ruiz came through the youth system of Nueva Chicago and debuted for the senior team in 2007. In August 2011, he joined Godoy Cruz of the Argentine Primera División. On 15 December 2016, it was reported that he signed for South Korean side Seoul E-Land FC, however, the transfer was never finalised.

References

External links 
 
 

1987 births
Living people
Footballers from Buenos Aires
Argentine footballers
Argentine expatriate footballers
Nueva Chicago footballers
Godoy Cruz Antonio Tomba footballers
Estudiantes de Buenos Aires footballers
Club Atlético Platense footballers
Juventud Unida Universitario players
Villa Dálmine footballers
Club Atlético Mitre footballers
Oriente Petrolero players
San Martín de San Juan footballers
Argentine Primera División players
Primera Nacional players
Primera B Metropolitana players
Ascenso MX players
Bolivian Primera División players
Association football wingers
Argentine expatriate sportspeople in Mexico
Expatriate footballers in Mexico
Argentine expatriate sportspeople in Bolivia
Expatriate footballers in Bolivia